Aly & AJ are an American pop rock duo that consists of sisters Alyson (Aly) and Amanda Joy Michalka (AJ) and signed a recording contract with Hollywood Records in 2004. Their debut album, Into the Rush, debuted at number 36 on the US Billboard 200, and was later certified gold by the Recording Industry Association of America (RIAA). It has sold 839,000 copies domestically and one million copies worldwide. Their third album, Insomniatic, peaked at number 15 on the Billboard 200, selling over 39,000 copies in its first week and becoming Aly & AJ's highest debut to date.

In 2009, Aly & AJ renamed themselves 78violet (pronounced "seventy-eight violet") and announced their departure from Hollywood Records the following year. In 2013, the sisters released their first single in five years, "Hothouse". The duo had planned to release a full-length album in 2014, which was later leaked onto the internet. On December 9, 2015, the duo announced they had decided to return to their original name, Aly & AJ. In 2017, they released their debut EP Ten Years, which was followed by an EP titled Sanctuary in 2019. On May 7, 2021, they released their fourth studio album, which marks their first album in 14 years.

History

2004–2006: Into the Rush and Acoustic Hearts of Winter 

Aly & AJ's debut studio album, Into the Rush, was released on August 16, 2005, and certified Gold by the RIAA in March 2006. The first single released from the album was the cover song "Do You Believe in Magic", originally recorded by The Lovin' Spoonful, which was used in the soundtrack of the made-for-TV Disney Channel original movie, Now You See It..., in which Aly had a starring role as Allyson Henlen. "Do You Believe in Magic" peaked at No. 2 on the U.S. Billboard Hot Singles Sales chart. The album's second single, "No One", was featured in the Walt Disney Pictures feature film Ice Princess and its soundtrack. "Walking on Sunshine", a cover of the Katrina and the Waves song, and "Never Far Behind" were released as further singles. On February 28, 2006, the fifth single from the album, "Rush", was released. The song was their first to chart on the Billboard Hot 100, peaking at number 59. "On the Ride" was released as the album's sixth single on March 7, 2006. It was featured in the Disney Channel Original Movie Cow Belles which starred Aly & AJ. Into the Rush has sold 839,000 copies in the United States and one million copies worldwide.

The album received positive reviews from critics. Fran Grauman from About.com gave the album a four star rating, praising Aly and AJ's "ton of talent" and "experience". Allmusic gave the album a mixed review, saying it "doesn't venture further than offering a few empowering ballads". AMG praised them for having a real singing ability, citing "Aly & AJ can actually sing – their vocals have more personality than prefab Disney hopefuls like Hayden Panettiere or Caleigh Peters – and the arrangements are slick without resorting to flashily empty pap." The review finishes by remarking, "Into the Rush is listenable, likeable and more about being memorable than being a Disney product." The album became the 112th best-selling album in the United States in 2006.

The sisters were involved in various Walt Disney Records projects. The "Aly & AJ Concert" took place on July 24, 2005, at the Henry Fonda theater in Hollywood, California. The aired concert was cut to five songs. The sisters opened for the Cheetah Girls in December 2005 on the Cheetah-licious Christmas Tour.

Into the Rush was re-released in August 2006 with three new songs, including the single "Chemicals React" and new versions of "Collapsed" and "Something More". This version served as their first album release in the United Kingdom. "Chemicals React" peaked at number 50 on the Billboard Hot 100. On September 26, 2006, the sisters released their second studio album, the Christmas-themed Acoustic Hearts of Winter, which contains contemporary recordings of traditional Christmas songs.  Acoustic Hearts of Winter debuted at No. 78 on the Billboard Hot 100, selling over 19,000 copies in its first week. The album also charted the U.S. Billboard Top Holiday Albums, debuting at No. 14. The holiday album later sold over 110,000 copies in the United States. In late 2007, the album was reissued with three more Christmas-themed selections.

2007–2008: Insomniatic 

The duo's third studio album, Insomniatic, was released on July 10, 2007. The album features a more electropop, electronic rock and dance-pop influenced sound different from their debut, with the use of synthesizers, synth-rock guitars, vocoder and electronic instruments. The album peaked at No. 15 on the Billboard 200, selling over 39,000 copies in its first week alone, and becoming Aly & AJ's highest debut to date. The album sold 700,000 copies in the United States. The album was preceded by the lead single "Potential Breakup Song". "Potential Breakup Song" peaked at No. 17 on Billboard's Hot 100, becoming their first top 20 single in the United States. The single was certified Platinum by the RIAA for sales surpassing 1 million copies.

In October 2007, both the single and the album were released in the United Kingdom; "Potential Breakup Song" reached a peak position of No. 22 in the United Kingdom and No. 16 in Ireland. Aly & AJ toured for a short while in the UK, opening for McFly twice and performing at several television shows and nightclubs. Time magazine named "Potential Breakup Song" one of the 10 Best Songs of 2007, ranking it at No. 9. Writer Josh Tyrangiel praised the authenticity of its having been written by the teenage sisters who sing it. The track also went to chart solely on digital download in several countries like the Netherlands, Norway and Canada.

Insomniatic was critically acclaimed. USA Today stated: "for Insomniatic, the sisters had a hand in writing every song. The single 'Potential Breakup Song' sounds somewhat like Del Shannon's 'Runaway' run through a processor, but there's a lot more going musically than on your average teen-pop album." Fraser McAlpine of BBC Radio stated: "Aly and AJ's previous album was rock-pop; some of it light and bubbly, some of it bordering on heaviness. Staccato, often angry pop but still definitely pop. Their second offering, 'Insomniatic,' with this as the lead single seems to have kept the staccato and the venom but added more layers of pop, to create something that sounds like My Chemical Romance going through a blender with some soft-hearted Angry Girl Music." McAlpine described "Potential Breakup Song" as having "the most danceable mental breakdown I've heard in quite some time."

In December 2007, the band replaced the Jonas Brothers as the opening act for Miley Cyrus's Best of Both Worlds Tour. In early January 2008, Aly & AJ performed a cover of KT Tunstall's "Black Horse and the Cherry Tree" on Yahoo's Pepsi Smash video site. The cover, recorded at Abbey Road Studios, was featured on the Japanese re-release of Insomniatic. "Like Whoa" was released as the second single from Insomniatic and reached number 63 on the Billboard Hot 100. Aly & AJ covered the Grand Funk Railroad song "We're an American Band" for Randy Jackson's Music Club, Vol. 1.

2009–2014: Departure from Hollywood Records and name change 

In early 2008, Billboard confirmed that Aly & AJ were working on a fourth studio album which was due to be released in late 2009. They mentioned in an interview with Radio Disney on April 23, 2008, that they were going for a "rockier" sound, and that this time they wanted to sing separately, not harmonizing their voices as they had on their previous albums, to let fans identify which Michalka sister was singing.

The duo wrote a song (later confirmed to be titled "The Next Worst Thing") with Weezer frontman Rivers Cuomo. They also worked with Chris Lord-Alge (Green Day, AFI, Sum 41) and Rob Cavallo (Green Day, the Goo Goo Dolls, Paramore), both producers in the rock genre. Throughout 2009, various songtitles were added to the database of Broadcast Music Incorporated, written and composed by the duo, and jointly written and composed in collaborations with Daniel James and Leah Haywood. On July 8, 2009, the duo announced that they changed the band's name to 78violet. The fourth Hollywood Records album release was delayed numerous times, and on February 19, 2010, 78violet announced on their official Facebook page that they had officially parted ways with Hollywood Records and this album would not be released. However, the duo stated that they were continuing to write and record for a new album.

On November 30, 2010, the first song under the 78violet name was released with the Hellcats soundtrack EP. 78violet recorded the theme song to Hellcats, titled "Belong Here". On January 24, 2011, a video of 78violet in the studio was released where a clip of a new song, titled "Suspended", was played. Some of the titles being considered for 78violet's fourth album were 8 Hours and 53rd floor. Aly mentioned that they had joined forces with a new production company.

On June 18, 2012, 78violet announced that they were "Off to NY to start cutting instrumentals for the record." On June 19, 2012, they announced that they had started the first day of production for the album, saying, "Officially the first day starting the album production: it's taken 5 years but we are here!" On June 22, they announced that the "Album track list is officially set:)", calling it "not what you expect". On October 15, 2012, they tweeted that their album is complete and expected sometime 2013, with the possibility of a single in summer of the same year. Aly & AJ later confirmed that the lead single would be "Hothouse".

On May 2, 2013, Aly & AJ signed to Red Light Management. "Hothouse" would be released on July 8, with an album to follow. The duo performed live for the first time in five years when they took the stage at the Roxy Theater in Los Angeles on June 26. The group announced that they would be releasing an EP in early 2014, however, this never materialized. The original Hothouse album was leaked in its entirety in 2014; the duo would go on to release it on vinyl as Sanctuary: Vol. 1 for first-year subscribers of their Sanctuary fan-club.

2015–present: Comeback, Ten Years, Sanctuary, A Touch of the Beat..., and With Love From
In 2015, the sisters returned to music and changed their name back to Aly & AJ. On June 2, 2017, they announced a new single, titled "Take Me". It served as the lead single from their EP Ten Years, and was released on August 17, 2017. The accompanying music video was released on September 14, 2017. Ten Years, was released on November 17, 2017. Two tracks from the EP, "I Know" and "The Distance", were featured in season 4 of Aly's TV series iZombie. On June 15, 2018, the duo released the single "Good Love". A deluxe version of Ten Years was released on November 30, 2018. On March 29, 2019, the pair released the single "Church" as the lead single from their second EP Sanctuary, released on May 10. The EP was supported by a North American tour of the same name which began on May 1, 2019. The duo released the singles "Attack of Panic" in February 2020, and "Joan of Arc on the Dance Floor" in May. Later in 2020, songs from both Ten Years and Sanctuary, as well as the non-album singles, were later released onto a compilation album titled We Don't Stop.

Their fourth studio album, A Touch of the Beat Gets You Up on Your Feet Gets You Out and Then Into the Sun, was released on May 7, 2021. The album was preceded by the singles "Slow Dancing" on December 2, 2020 and "Listen!!!" in January 2021. Following the growing popularity of "Potential Breakup Song" on the social media app TikTok, Aly & AJ released two re-recorded versions of the song in December 2020: one with clean lyrics and an explicit version. Following the re-recording of "Potential Breakup Song", the duo have released re-recordings of their songs "Like Whoa" and "Chemicals React" in 2022, subtitled "(A&A Version)". The duo's fifth studio album, With Love From, was released on March 15, 2023. It was preceded by the title track as the lead single on November 2, 2022; the second single "Baby Lay Your Head Down" on January 25, 2023; and the third single "After Hours" on February 15. The band will begin touring in March 2023.

Activism 
Since their return to music in 2017, the duo have extensively used their platform to advocate for political causes - particularly the advancement of LGBTQ+ rights & the importance of voting, stating in a 2019 interview "It's our job to use our platform for good, whether that's aligning ourselves to great organisations or charities that need our help." Other causes and organisations the pair have voiced support for include the Black Lives Matter movement and Planned Parenthood.

The pair's 2019 Sanctuary Tour had numerous activist partners. One such partner was HeadCount, an organisation dedicated to registering voters in the United States. Fans were able to learn more about voter registration and register to vote at the tour's concerts. Another partner was The Trevor Project, an organisation dedicated to youth suicide prevention in the LGBTQ+ community. The duo donated a free meet & greet per show, with fans able to sign a petition to end conversion therapy & donate to the charity to be entered into a prize draw. Also partnered with the tour were Project HEAL, a charity dedicated to increasing access to treatment for eating disorders. The partnership followed a 2018 fundraiser for the charity, with the sisters donating signed merchandise, personalised videos and a meet-up opportunity to be sold and auctioned to raise funds.

The sisters wrote an op-ed for Paper magazine in early 2019, revealing their own battles with depression and anxiety in the hopes of raising awareness and removing stigma around mental health medication. The piece also highlighted the particular struggle with self-worth the youth LGBTQ+ community faces, stating "Just within the small community of people who listen to our music exists an unknowable and vast amount of human potential, love, and possibility. ... If we can play a small part in furthering any one person's love for themselves then we've done a small good and our fight to get our music heard is justified." In 2020 the duo released single "Attack of Panic", which dealt with themes of anxiety and panic attacks.

The music video for their 2020 single "Joan of Arc on the Dance Floor", directed by Aly and her husband, Stephen Ringer, featured clips of Republican members of the Senate Judiciary Committee, who were responsible for the 2018 confirmation of Supreme Court Justice Brett Kavanaugh in the wake of sexual assault allegations against him, as well as a thank you to his accuser Christine Blasey Ford. The video's credits also include a thank you to Anita Hill, who accused Justice Clarence Thomas of sexual harassment in 1991 prior to his appointment to the Supreme Court.

The duo partnered with Propeller in 2018, a site aimed at fostering social consciousness among music fans. They are currently running a contest through the site in which fans can earn points in exchange for charitable donations and petition signatures, points can then be redeemed for the chance to win an in-person experience which includes a preview of upcoming music. The site hosted donations for the duo's 2020 all-night live stream, "Up All Night with Aly & AJ". The stream included a full live-band concert, acoustic performances, reactions to their earlier work & conversations with friends & collaborators. The stream raised US$30,000 for 13 charities: Color of Change, Frontline Foods, Save our Stages, Project Heal, Women's History Museum, The Art of Elysium, The Trevor Project, Nalleli Cobo, GLAAD, Sierra Club, MusiCares, The Beauty Bus Foundation, and the Red Cross.

The pair participated in phone banking events for Senate candidate Amy McGrath at the 2020 United States Senate election as well as for Senate candidates Jon Ossoff and Raphael Warnock in their respective Georgia run-off races in early 2021. They also phone banked and supported Joe Biden in the general election of the 2020 United States presidential election.

Other work

Acting 
The duo have both pursued separate acting careers outside of their music, as well as having starred in some joint projects. Most notably, the pair starred as sisters in the 2006 Disney Channel Original movie Cow Belles, with "On the Ride" from their debut album Into The Rush serving as the movie's theme song. The sisters also starred in a Disney Channel television pilot Haversham Hall, although the show was not picked up for series. In 2015, the pair starred together in Weepah Way For Now, an independent comedy-drama film which premiered at the Los Angeles Film Festival. The film was produced by the duo and written & directed by Aly's husband Stephen Ringer. The pair played sisters again in the movie, with the characters loosely based on their own personalities and relationship.  They were featured in the March 7, 2022, episode "Yippee Ki-Yay" of The Good Doctor as a fractured sister act.

Merchandise 
In 2007 Huckleberry Toys released Limited Edition Hello Kitty Aly & AJ dolls to selected Target stores. Toys R Us sold a line of the dolls beginning on November 15, 2007. On November 20, 2007, The Aly & AJ Adventure game was released for the Nintendo DS. In the game, the player plays as their assistant, who helps them record songs and direct a music video.

In June 2008, the duo released their own paperback adventure books, called Aly & AJ's Rock 'n' Roll Mysteries, each part describing Aly & AJ on tour, every book describing a mystery in a different city. The drawings in the books were done by Aly. The first two (First Stop, New York and Mayhem in Miami) were released on June 12, the third installment (Singing in Seattle) on September 2, and the last (Nashville Nights) went to stores on October 4, 2008.

Performance Designed Products released Aly & AJ-designed guitars on November 10, 2008. Aly's guitar features a heart-and-crossbones print in pink (PlayStation 2) and AJ's guitar is in the shape of the Aly & AJ heart logo featuring bright pink and purple zebra print (Wii, PS2). The duo launched the guitars on October 11, 2008, during event at Universal Studios CityWalk in California. The duo also had clothing, accessories, jewelry, and cosmetics lines. According to Forbes and AOL, they were one of Hollywood's highest earning singers under the age of 30 in 2008.

Personal lives

Stalking incidents 
On June 26, 2008, an Ohio man named Rex Mettler was arrested for stalking the duo. The Lancaster man "obtained contact information for the acting and singing duo and made threats online, by phone and handwritten notes" as stated by the police. The duo was scheduled to perform in Cincinnati on June 27, 2008, where the man was present, after which the police could not confirm that any of the threats involved the Ohio show. The police later stated that "the charge against Mettler stems from incidents that began December 15, 2007" and that "Rex displayed a pattern of activity over that time that reflected multiple attempts, if not numerous attempts, at stalking these females."

Two years later, on June 17, 2010, Caesar Brantley was arrested on suspicion of stalking the duo. He pleaded not guilty. Aly claimed Brantley is an "obsessed fan" who is determined to marry her "no matter what" in filings for the restraining order. Another court hearing was scheduled on June 30.

Religion 
Along with making music for the mainstream audience, Aly & AJ, who are both very open about their faith, were significant in the Christian music rock scene. "Never Far Behind" was only released on Christian rock radio. It went to No. 1 on Radio & Records (R&R) Christian CHR. The duo does not wish to be labeled as Christian music artists. In an interview with Blender magazine in June 2006, Aly & AJ said that their music comes from a Christian perspective. "We don't ever wanna preach or shove anything down people's throats, but we want our music to be inspiring." AJ added, "If we have a Muslim fan or an atheist fan, that's their thing – I'm gonna love them no matter what." They also expressed their disbelief in evolution. In 2018, Aly & AJ stated in an interview that they do believe in evolution. The pair have since rescinded their anti-evolution-theory stance in response to a fan on Twitter, writing: "Yes to evolution ... thank God for the glow up in not just body but mind".

In 2010, Aly Michalka stated in an interview with Seventeen magazine, "My faith is definitely a big part of my life, but not part of my career. It is something that guides me. But I feel like when you make a declaration of your religion, people automatically go after you when that purity ring comes off. So I don't want to set myself up for that kind of judgment."

Discography 

Studio albums
 Into the Rush (2005)
 Acoustic Hearts of Winter (2006)
 Insomniatic (2007)
 A Touch of the Beat Gets You Up on Your Feet Gets You Out and Then Into the Sun (2021)
 With Love From (2023)

Extended plays
 Ten Years (2017)
 Sanctuary (2019)

Tours 
Main
 Mini Mall Tour (2005)
 Living Room Tour (2006)
 Holiday Season Tour (2006)
 Nextfest Summer Tour (2007) 
 Insomniatic Tour (2008)
 Mini Summer Tour (2008)
 Promises Tour (2018)
 Sanctuary Tour (2019)
 A Touch of the Beat Tour (2022)
 With Love From Tour (2023)

Supporting
 The Cheetah Girls Cheetah-licious Christmas Tour (2005)
 The Cheetah Girls The Party's Just Begun Tour (2006)
 Best of Both Worlds Tour (2008)
 Reverie Tour (2022)

Awards and nominations

References

External links 

 
 

 
2004 establishments in California
21st-century American women singers
21st-century American singers
All-female bands
American pop music duos
American pop girl groups
American girl groups
Female musical duos
Hollywood Records artists
Living people
Musical groups established in 2004
Musical groups from Los Angeles
Musical groups from California
Sibling musical duos
Year of birth missing (living people)